Avni Akgün (born 1932) is a Turkish athlete. He competed in the men's long jump at the 1952 Summer Olympics.

References

External links

1932 births
Living people
Athletes (track and field) at the 1952 Summer Olympics
Turkish male long jumpers
Olympic athletes of Turkey
Place of birth missing (living people)
Mediterranean Games gold medalists for Turkey
Mediterranean Games bronze medalists for Turkey
Mediterranean Games medalists in athletics
Athletes (track and field) at the 1951 Mediterranean Games
20th-century Turkish people